The Men's combined competition of the Calgary 1988 Olympics was held at Nakiska.

The defending world champion was Marc Girardelli of Luxembourg, while Switzerland's Pirmin Zurbriggen was the defending World Cup combined champion, and Austria's Hubert Strolz led the 1988 World Cup.

Results

References

External links

Men's combined
Winter Olympics